Rilla Mill is a village in Cornwall, England. It is about one and half miles west of Linkinhorne.

References

Villages in Cornwall